Christopher Donald Jackson (27 July 1948 – 25 September 2015) was a Canadian organist, harpsichordist and choral conductor. He is best known as a specialist in the performance of Renaissance music, and as the co-founder and long time conductor of the Studio de musique ancienne de Montréal.

Early life and education
Jackson was born in Halifax, Nova Scotia. He graduated from the École de musique Vincent-d'Indy and the Conservatoire de musique du Québec à Montréal.

Career
As a young man, Jackson worked as an organ builder. He began teaching at Concordia University in 1973.
Jackson co-founded both the Société des Concerts d'orgue de Montréal and the Studio de musique ancienne de Montréal in 1974. He became the artistic director of the latter institutions in 1988. He conducted the ensemble in several recordings, including the 1998 Heavenly Spheres, which was awarded a Félix Award from the ADISQ and the Juno Award for Classical Album of the Year – Vocal or Choral Performance in 2000.

Jackson taught at the music faculties of Concordia University and McGill University. He was Dean of the Faculty of Fine Arts at Concordia University from 1994 to 2005. He also held the post of organist and choirmaster at a variety of churches in Montreal, including Eglise Tres-Saint-Nom de Jesus, and St. George's Anglican Church.

Jackson received an honorary doctorate from the University of Sudbury in 1999 and was inducted as a member of the Royal Society of Canada in 2009.

In 2011 Jackson conducted the Studio de music ancienne for the recording of an album, Musica Vaticana.

Jackson died of lung cancer on September 25, 2015 in Montreal, aged 67.

Selected discography
Heinrich Schütz : Christmas Story. CD Fonovox VOX7847-2 1981
H. I. F. Biber : Vespers. CD  REM311207 1993
Giacomo Carissimi : Jonas, Jephté.  Marc-Antoine Charpentier : le Reniement de Saint Pierre H.424. CD Analekta 1994
 André Campra, Henry Dumont : Le Chant de la Jérusalem des terres froides. CD  K617 1995 (reissue Montréal et Indiens Abenakis 2001, Musique sacrée en Nouvelle-France ACD22764 2017)
Henry Desmarest : 4 Motets Lorrains. 2 CD K617053 1995
Palestrina : Missa Ut re mi fa sol la. CD Analekta
Heavenly spheres - L’Harmonie des Sphères, Mouton, Gombert, Lassus, Morales, Palestrina, Victoria. CD CBC
Sacred Spaces - Lieux sacrés, G. Gabrieli and Monteverdi CBC 2002
Puer natus est  Giovanni Gabrieli Concerto Palatino ACD22311 11/2003
Arvo Pärt : Stabat Mater ACD22310 03/2004
Marc-Antoine Charpentier : Messe à quatre chœurs  H.4, 3 Psaumes des Ténèbres, H.228, H.229, H.230, Ensemble Stradivaria, Studio de Musique ancienne de Montréal. CD Atma 2005
Rise, O my soul Bull,  William Byrd, Orlando Gibbons, William Simmes,  Thomas Tomkins,   Ward, ACD22506 03/2007
Roma Triumphans Luca Marenzio et al. SACD22507 01/2008
Orlando di Lasso : Lagrime di San Pietro ACD22509 09/2010
Musica Vaticana ACD22508 09/2011
Splendore a Venezia (compilation) ACD23013 10/2013
Terra Tremuit : Brumel Missa Et ecce terrae motus ACD22653 03/2014
Orlando di Lasso : Laudate Dominum ACD22746 03/2017

References

External links
"Christopher Jackson" at AllMusic

juno

1948 births
2015 deaths
Canadian conductors (music)
Male conductors (music)
Canadian harpsichordists
Male classical organists
Academic staff of Concordia University
Conservatoire de musique du Québec à Montréal alumni
École de musique Vincent-d'Indy alumni
Academic staff of McGill University
Musicians from Halifax, Nova Scotia
Musicians from Montreal
Deaths from lung cancer
Deaths from cancer in Quebec
Canadian classical organists